Arismendi Municipality may refer to the following places in the Venezuela:

Arismendi Municipality, Barinas
Arismendi Municipality, Nueva Esparta
Arismendi Municipality, Sucre

Municipality name disambiguation pages